Jānis Vagris (born ) is a Latvian politician. He served as the sixth Chairman of the Presidium of the Supreme Soviet of the Latvian Soviet Socialist Republic from 1985 to 1988, and as Secretary of the Central Committee of the Communist Party of Latvia from 1988 to 1990.

Early life 
Vagris was born on 17 October 1930 in Naudītes Parish. He graduated from the Faculty of Mechanics at the University of Latvia and the Higher Party School of the Central Committee of the Communist Party of the Soviet Union in 1955.

Career 
He then worked as an engineer at a factory in Jelgava. During this time Vagris also served as the deputy chairman of the executive committee of the city. Vagris joined the Communist Party of the Soviet Union in 1958. From 1966 to 1973, Vagris was the first and second secretary of the Liepājā city committee, after which he joined the Communist Party of Latvia.

In 1978 Vagris was appointed as the first secretary of the Riga city committee. On  he became the sixth chairmen of the Presidium of the Supreme Soviet of the Latvian Soviet Socialist Republic. On  Vagris was promoted to the First Secretary of the Central Committee of the Communist Party of Latvia. He made a speech at the Mežaparks Great Bandstand, three days before the Popular Front of Latvia's first congress. In 1989 Vagris was elected to the Congress of People's Deputies of the Soviet Union. On  Vagris was succeeded by Alfrēds Rubiks as secretary. In later evaluations, Vagris' role during the revival was revealed to be ambiguous.

Awards 

 Order of the Three Stars and the role of Officer (2010)
 Orders of the October Revolution 
 Red Banner of Labour. 
 Meritorious Industrial Worker of the Latvian SSR.

References

1930 births
Heads of state of the Latvian Soviet Socialist Republic
Heads of the Communist Party of Latvia
Latvian engineers
Recipients of the Order of the Red Banner of Labour
Living people
People from Dobele Municipality
University of Latvia alumni